Aynova is a rural locality (a village) in Karkogorskoye Rural Settlement of Pinezhsky District, Arkhangelsk Oblast, Russia. The population was 77 as of 2010. There are 4 streets.

Geography 
Aynova is located on the Pinega River, 8 km southeast of Karpogory (the district's administrative centre) by road. Kevrola is the nearest rural locality.

References 

Rural localities in Pinezhsky District